RLI may refer to:

Organizations
RLI Corp., an American property and casualty insurance company
Rand Light Infantry, South Africa
Renaissance Learning, an educational assessment and learning analytics company
Rhodesian Light Infantry, Military unit inside the Rhodesian army.
Royal Lancaster Infirmary, a hospital in Lancaster, England
Rugby League Ireland
Reiner Lemoine Institut, an independent research institute investigating renewable energy and based in Berlin, Germany

Other uses
RLI (gene), also known as ABCE1, a protein required for translation initiation in eukaryotes
RLi, an abbreviation for an organolithium reagent
Red List Index, an indicator of global biodiversity